John or Jack Donahue may refer to:
John Donahue (baseball) (1894–1949), Major League Baseball right fielder
Jiggs Donahue (John Augustine Donahue, 1879–1913), Major League Baseball first baseman and catcher
Deacon Donahue (John Stephen Michael Donahue, 1920–2008), Major League Baseball relief pitcher
John F. Donahue (died 2017), chairman of Federated Investors
Jack Donahue (1806–1830), Australian bushranger
Jack Donahue (American football) (1904–1984), American football player and coach
Jack Donahue (politician) (born 1944), Louisiana state senator from St. Tammany Parish

See also
Jonathan Donahue (born 1966), rock musician
John Donoghue (disambiguation)
Jack Donohue (disambiguation)